Aakheperre Shoshenq V was an ancient Egyptian pharaoh of the late 22nd Dynasty.

Despite having enjoyed one of the longest reigns of the entire dynasty – 38 years – and having left a fair amount of attestations, little is known about Shoshenq's life. His realm underwent an unstoppable shrinking due to the progressive increase of independence of various tribal chiefs, princes and concurrent kings, above all the pharaoh–to–be Tefnakht.

Reign

Overview

According to a Serapeum stela dated to his Year 11, Shoshenq was son and successor of Pami. He ascended to the throne in ca. 767 BC and, despite little information about his life, he is well attested by several monuments, dated and not. However, the provenance of such findings is limited to the Eastern Nile Delta – in fact the territory under his authority – and noticeably, he is completely unrecorded in Thebes. Furthermore, it looks that during Shoshenq's reign his lordship above the city of Memphis and the westernmost part of his realms phased out for the benefit of the Libyan chiefs of the Western Delta such as Osorkon C and, ultimately, Tefnakht of Sais. At the end of his long reign – most likely lasting 38 years – Shoshenq ruled little more than the districts of Tanis and Bubastis.

Before the discovery of the proper Shoshenq IV, Shoshenq V was often referred to with the "IV" numeral (for example:).

Attestations
Shoshenq's Year 11 is recorded at Memphis, commemorating the death, burial and replacement of the Apis bull which was installed in the Year 2 of Pami. Shoshenq is also attested in his years 7 and 15 (or 17), 19, 30, and 37 by donation stelae of different Great Chiefs of the Libu, named Tjerpahati, Ker, Rudamun and Ankhhor respectively. Then, his name appears again on a stela from Atfih, dedicated to the goddess Hathor in Shoshenq's Year 22.
At Tanis, he ordered a temple for the Theban Triad, with particular emphasis on the god Khonsu. Probably in his Year 30, he also celebrated his Sed festival by adding a jubilee chapel to the aforementioned temple. These buildings were later dismantled and a sacred lake was made in their place. Yet, from the remains of the buildings, it is known that Shoshenq celebrated the festival by adopting brand-new Horus, Nebty and Golden Horus names, and by adding complements to his Throne and personal names, in sharp contrast with the plain and simple titulary used in most of his monuments (the one reported in the box) which was possibly a form of archaism. Undated monuments of Shoshenq V were unearthed at Tell el-Yahudiyeh.
In Year 37 of Shoshenq, the Apis bull installed in his Year 11 died and was buried. The event is commemorated on several Serapeum stelae, the most famous among these being the Stela of Pasenhor, which also provided a valuable genealogy of the early 22nd Dynasty and its Libyan origin. This bull eventually outlived Shoshenq, dying in Year 5 of pharaoh Bakenranef of the 24th Dynasty.
Shoshenq V's highest Year date is an anonymous Year 38 donation stela from Buto issued by Tefnakht (here boasting several titles, but not yet a pharaoh) which can only belong to his reign since Tefnakht was a late contemporary of this king. This stela, which reads simply as "Regnal Year 38 under the Majesty of the King of Upper and Lower Egypt, Lord of the Two Lands, [BLANK], Son of Re, [BLANK]," may reflect the growing power of Tefnakht in the Western Delta at the expense of Shoshenq V whose name is omitted from the document. The same argument can be applied to a similar stela, again issued by Tefnakht but in an anonymous Year 36 which again can only belong to Shoshenq's reign.

Death and succession
Shoshenq V died probably in 730 BC. Besides his father Pami, his family relationships are not entirely clear, but it is often assumed that his successor was Osorkon IV who also may have been his son. It is known that Osorkon's mother was queen Tadibast III; thus, she was possibly Shoshenq's queen. However, this reconstruction is complicated by the presence of the poorly known pharaoh Pedubast II who is sometimes placed as Shoshenq's successor.

References

8th-century BC Pharaohs
Pharaohs of the Twenty-second Dynasty of Egypt
730s BC deaths